The Yusufzai or Yousafzai, also referred to as the Esapzai , or Yusufzai Afghans historically, are one of the largest tribes of ethnic Pashtuns. They are natively based in the northern part of Khyber Pakhtunkhwa (Malakand, Dir, Swat, Shangla, Buner, Swabi, Mardan, Bajaur, Peshawar, Tor Ghar), to which they migrated to from Kabul during the 16th century, but they are also present in smaller numbers in parts of Afghanistan, including Kunar, Kabul, Kandahar and Farah. Outside of these countries, they can be found in Ghoriwala District Bannu (Mughal Khel), Balochistan Sibi (Akazai), Chagai (Hassanzai) and Rohilkandh.

Most of the Yusufzai speak a northern variety of Pashto and some southern variety of Pashto (as in case of Mughal Khel) and Afghan dialect Persian; the Yusufzai dialect is considered prestigious in Pakistan's Khyber Pakhtunkhwa province.

Etymology
In Pashto phonology, as /f/ is found only in loanwords and tends to be replaced by /p/, the name is usually pronounced as Yūsəpzay or Īsəpzay. The name literally means "descendant of Yusuf" in Pashto; Yūsuf is an Arabic and Aramaic masculine given name meaning "(God) shall add."

According to some scholars, including philologist J.W. McCrindle, the name Yūsəpzay or Īsəpzay is derived from the tribal names of Aspasioi and Assakenoi – the ancient inhabitants of the Kunar Valley and the Swat Valley who offered resistance when Alexander invaded their land in 327–326 BCE. According to historian R.C. Majumdar, the Assakenoi were either allied to or a branch of the larger Aspasioi, and both of these ancient tribal names were probably derived from the word Aśvaka, which literally means "horsemen", "horse breeders", or "cavalrymen" (from aśva or aspa, the Sanskrit and Avestan words for "horse").

McCrindle noted: "The name of the Aśvaka indicates that their country was renowned in primitive times, as it is at the present day, for its superior breed of horses. The fact that the Greeks translated their name into "Hippasioi" (from ἵππος, a horse) shows that they must have been aware of its etymological signification."

The name of the Aśvakan or Assakan is also the origin of the ethnonym Afghān, which has been historically used for all Pashtuns.

Mythical genealogy
According to a popular mythical genealogy, recorded by 17th-century Mughal courtier Nimat Allah al-Harawi in his book Tārīkh-i Khān Jahānī wa Makhzan-i Afghānī, the Yusufzai tribe descended from their eponymous ancestor Yūsuf, who was son of Mand, who was son of Khashay (or Khakhay), who was son of Kand, who was son of Kharshbūn, who was son of Saṛban (progenitor of the Sarbani tribal confederacy), who was son of Qais Abdur Rashid (progenitor of all Pashtuns). Qais Abdur Rashid was a descendant of Afghana, who was described as a grandson of the Israelite king Saul and commander-in-chief of the army of prophet Solomon. Qais was claimed to be a contemporary of the Islamic prophet Muhammad and a kinsman of Arab commander Khalid ibn al-Walid. When Khalid ibn al-Walid summoned Qais from Ghor to Medina, Qais accepted Islam and the prophet renamed him Abdur Rashīd (meaning "Servant of the Guide to the Right Path" or "Servant of God" in Arabic). Abdur Rashid returned to Ghor and introduced Islam there. The book stated that Yūsuf's grandfather (and Mand's father), Khashay, also had two other sons, Muk and Tarkalāṇī, who were the progenitors of the Gigyani and Tarkani tribes, respectively. Yūsuf had one brother, Umar, who was the progenitor of the Mandanr tribe, which is closely related to Yusufzais.

The 1595 Mughal account Ain-i-Akbari also mentioned the tradition of Israelite descent among Pashtuns, which shows that the tradition was already popular among 16th-century Pashtuns.

History

Peace treaty with Babur

During the early modern period, the Yusufzai tribe of Afghans was first explicitly mentioned in Baburnama by Babur, a Timurid ruler from Fergana (in present-day Uzbekistan) who captured Kabul in 1504. On 21 January 1519, two weeks after his Bajaur massacre, Babur wrote: "On Friday we marched for Sawad (Swat), with the intention of attacking the Yusufzai Afghans, and dismounted in between the water of Panjkora and the united waters of Chandāwal (Jandul) and Bajaur. Shah Mansur Yusufzai had brought a few well-flavoured and quite intoxicating confections."

As part of a treaty with Yusufzai Afghans, Babur married Bibi Mubarika, daughter of Yusufzai chief Shah Mansur, on 30 January 1519.Bibi Mubarika played an important role in the establishment of friendly relations of Yusufzai Pashtun chiefs with Babur, who later founded the Mughal Empire after defeating Pashtun Sultan Ibrahim Lodi at the First Battle of Panipat in 1526. One of Mubarika's brothers, Mir Jamal Yusufzai, accompanied Babur to India in 1525 and later held high posts under Mughal emperors Humayun and Akbar.

Skirmishes with Mughal forces
During the 1580s, many Yusufzais and Mandanrs rebelled against the Mughals and joined the Roshani movement of Pir Roshan. In late 1585, Mughal Emperor Akbar sent military forces under Zain Khan Koka and Birbal to crush the rebellion. In February 1586, about 8,000 Mughal soldiers, including Birbal, were killed near the Karakar Pass between Swat and Buner by the Yusufzai lashkar led by Kalu Khan. This was the greatest disaster faced by the Mughal Army during Akbar's reign.

In 1630, under the leadership of Pir Roshan's great-grandson, Abdul Qadir, thousands of Pashtuns from the Yusufzai,  Mandanrs, Kheshgi, Mohmand, Afridi, Bangash, and other tribes launched an attack on the Mughal Army in Peshawar. In 1667, the Yusufzai again revolted against the Mughals, with one of their chiefs in Swat proclaiming himself the king. Muhammad Amin Khan brought a 9,000 strong Mughal Army from Delhi to suppress the revolt. Although the Mughal Emperor Aurangzeb was able to conquer the southern Yusufzai plains within the northern Kabul valley, he failed to wrest Swat and the adjoining valleys from the control of the Yusufzai.

Durrani period

Ahmad Shah Durrani (1747–1772), the founder of the Afghan Durrani Empire, categorized all Afghan tribes into four ulūs (tribal confederacies) for administrative purposes: Durrani, Ghilji, Sur, and Bar Durrani ("Upper Durranis"). The Yusufzai were included in the Bar Durrani confederacy along with other eastern Pashtun tribes, including the Mohmand, Afridi, Bangash, and Khattak. The Bar Durrani were also known as the Rohilla, and comprised the bulk of those Pashtuns who settled in Rohilkhand, India.

Najib ad-Dawlah, who belonged to the Yusufzai tribe, was a prominent Rohilla chief. In the 1740s, he founded the city of Najibabad in Rohilkhand. In 1757, he supported Ahmad Shah Durrani in his attack on Delhi. After his victory, Ahmad Shah Durrani re-installed the Mughal emperor Alamgir II on the Delhi throne as the titular Mughal head, but gave the actual control of Delhi to Najib ad-Daula. From 1757 to 1770, Najib ad-Daula served as the governor of Saharanpur, also ruling over Dehradun. In 1761, he took part in the Third Battle of Panipat and provided thousands of Rohilla troops and many guns to Ahmad Shah Durrani to defeat the Marathas. He also convinced Shuja-ud-Daula, the Nawab of Awadh, to join the Durrani forces. Before his departure from Delhi, Ahmad Shah Durrani appointed Najib ad-Dawlah as mir bakshi (paymaster-general) of the Mughal emperor Shah Alam II. After his death in 1770, Najib ad-Dawlah was succeeded by his son, Zabita Khan, who was defeated in 1772 by the Marathas, forcing him to flee from Rohilkhand. However, the descendants of Najib ad-Dawlah continued to rule Najibabad area until they were defeated by the British at Nagina on 21 April 1858 during the Indian Rebellion of 1857.

Today, many Yusufzais are settled in India, most notably in Rohilkhand region, as well as in Farrukhabad, which was founded in 1714 by Pashtun Nawab Muhammad Khan Bangash.

States of Swat and Dir

In 1849, Yusufzais established the state of Swat under the leadership of Saidu Baba, who appointed Sayyid Akbar Shah, a descendant of Pir Baba, as the first emir. After Akbar Shah's death in 1857, Saidu Baba assumed control of the state himself. In Dir, descendants of 17th-century Akhund Ilyas Yusufzai, the founder of the city of Dir, laid the foundation of the state of Dir. In 1897, the British Raj annexed Dir and granted the title of the "Nawab of Dir" to Sharif Khan Akhundkhel, the ruler of Dir (1886–1904). In 1926, the British Raj granted the title of the "Wali of Swat" to Miangul Abdul Wadud, the ruler of Swat (1918–1949).

The princely states of Swat and Dir existed until 1969, after which they were merged into West Pakistan, and then in 1970 into the North-West Frontier Province (present-day Khyber Pakhtunkhwa) of Pakistan. Their area is part of the present-day Buner, Lower Dir, Upper Dir, Malakand, Shangla, and Swat districts.

Yousafzai of Ghoriwala

One of Iliaszai grandson through Taje, was a man named Gadezai, who had five sons: Hassan, Behram, Ali Sher, Hussain, and Ibrahim. The first four sons settled in present-day District Buner, while Ibrahim was separated from them during the massacre of Yousafzai by Ulugh Beg in Kabul. Initially settling in Kurram, Ibrahim's descendants eventually migrated to Ghoriwala in present-day District Bannu.

Ibrahim had only one son named Hassan Khan, and his family was known as Hassan Khel. However, after one of his descendant, Mughal Khan Yousafzai, his tribe came to be known as Mughal Khel. Mughal Khan's leadership and capabilities helped establish his tribe as one of the leading and honorable tribes of Bannu. Jaffar Khan Yousafzai, Mughal Khan's grandson, also earned a name and place for himself among the elders of the district. He also commissioned the construction of a beautiful mosque in Bannu Bazar in around 1820s.

The Mughal Khel tribe has the following sub-tribes: Qasim Khel, Jaffar Khel, Hakim Khel, and Madasam Khel. The Mughal Khel have ruled and held the position of maliks in Ghoriwala for more than 300 years. Due to centuries of living in a land far away from their brethren, the Mughal Khels gradually assimilated in the local society, adopting the local elements and thus have transitioned from the Hard Pashto pronunciations to Soft Pashto but still in their speech and appearance their long lost characters can be identified.

As the author of Bannu Gazetteer said:

Pashto dialect
Yusufzai Pashto, which is a variety of Northern Pashto, is the prestige variety of Pashto in the Khyber Pakhtunkhwa province of Pakistan. Some of its consonants differ from the other dialects:

Society
The Yusufzai Pashtun aristocracy was historically divided into several communities based on patrilineal segmentary groups:
Khān
The khān referred to the Yusufzai landowners. In the 16th century, saint Sheikh Milli, a prominent Yusufzai dignitary, distributed the Yusufzai land among the major Yusufzai tribal clans (khēl). However, to avoid inequalities, he ordered that the lands should not become permanent property of the clans, but rather they should be realloted within the patrilineal clans periodically after every ten years or so. In this system (wēsh), each landowning khān would own shares (brakha) representing his proportion of the total area distributed. Through a regular rotation of ownership, the Yusufzai landowners would migrate for up to 30 miles for their new share after each cycle, although the tenants cultivating the land would stay on.

The wēsh system operated among the Yusufzai of Swat region until at least 1920s.
Hamsāya
The hamsāya or "shade sharers" were the clients or dependents from other (non-Yusufzai) Pashtun tribes who became attached to the Yusufzai tribe over the years. 
Faqīr
The faqīr or "poor" were the non-Pashtun landless peasants who were assigned to the Yusufzai landowners. As dependent peasants, the faqīr used to pay rent for the land they cultivated.

In the 19th century, the distinction between hamsāya as a "dependent Pashtun tribe"  and faqīr as "non-Pashtun landless peasants" became blurred. Both terms were then interchangeably used to simply refer to landless dependents or clients.
Mlātəṛ
The mlātəṛ or "supporters" provided services to their patrons as artisans (kasabgar), musicians (ḍəm), herders, or commercial agents, mostly in return for a payment in grain or rice.
Ghulām
The ghulām or "slaves" were more closely attached to their patron and his family and frequently entrusted with a variety of functions within their master's household. Although the ghulām were less free as compared to the hamsāya or the faqīr, they generally enjoyed a higher status in the society.

Subtribes
Abakhel
Akazai
Babuzai
Shamozai
Balarkhel
Chagharzai
Degankhel
Dalokhel
Hassanzai
Kamalzai
Khan Khel
Khwaja Khel (Khwajgan)
Madakhel
Mahabatkhel

Mandanr
Khadarzai
Babakhel
Barakhankhel
Mughal Khel
Niamatkhel

Akozai
Nikpikhel
Ranizai
Tahirkheli
Mulakhel
Edadkhel
Malizai

Notable Yusufzais/Yousafzais 
 Gaju Khan
 Bibi Mubarika
 Kalu Khan
 Malala Yousafzai (born 1997), Pashtun female education activist and Nobel Peace Prize laureate, from the Dalokhel subclan
 Sheikh Uthman ibn Farooq Yusufzai, Pashtun Sheikh and Da’i from San Diego, popular on social media
 Ziauddin Yousafzai (born 1969), Pashtun education activist and father of Malala Yousafzai, from the Dalokhel subclan
 Bhaku Khan Yousafzai
 Najib Khan Yousafzai
 Captain Sher Khan
 Rahimullah Yusufzai
 Murad Saeed
 Nigar Johar
 Junaid Khan
 Abaseen Yousafzai
 Salim Khan (Ancestral, born in Balaghat, India)
 Jafar Khan Yusufzai, Former Raes of Mughal Khel Tappa, Bannu
 Dr Abdul Qadeer Khan (Urdu Speaker from Bhopal, India)

Notes
 In Pashto, "Yusufzai" ([jusəpˈzay]) is the masculine singular form of the word. Its feminine singular is "Yusufzey" ([jusəpˈzəy]), while its plural is "Yusufzee" ([jusəpˈzi]).

References

 
Social groups of Pakistan
Groups claiming Israelite descent